The Ōamaru River is a river of the centre of New Zealand's North Island.

See also
List of rivers of New Zealand

References

Taupō District
Rivers of Waikato
Rivers of New Zealand